

Physiology and pharmacology